Rapid River is a  river in Kalkaska County in the U.S. state of Michigan. The river empties into the Torch River at the community of Torch River just south of Torch Lake.

See also
List of rivers of Michigan
Elk River Chain of Lakes Watershed

References 

Rivers of Michigan
Rivers of Kalkaska County, Michigan
Tributaries of Lake Michigan